Mala Varnica is a settlement in the Haloze Hills in the Municipality of Videm in eastern Slovenia. The area traditionally belonged to the Styria region. It is now included in the Drava Statistical Region.

References

External links
Mala Varnica on Geopedia

Populated places in the Municipality of Videm